The Aaron A. Sargent House was built prior to 1856, and is located in Nevada City, California at 449 Broad Street. Its architecture and engineering were significant during the periods of 1850–1874, 1875–1899, 1900–1924. The single family home is an Italianate Style Victorian design.

When Aaron Augustus Sargent brought his new bride, Ellen Clark Sargent, to Nevada City on 23 October 1852, he provided a home near the intersection of Broad and Bennett Streets, an area later referred to as Nabob Hill. Over the years, the Sargents and other renovated the home.

At one time, it was owned by physician, Dr. Carl Muller. It is currently the Grandmere's Inn.

Landmark
On 20 June 1980, this Nevada County building was designated as a landmark by the National Register of Historic Places.

See also
National Register of Historic Places listings in Nevada County, California

References

External links

 Official website

Houses in Nevada County, California
Buildings and structures in Nevada City, California
Houses on the National Register of Historic Places in California
National Register of Historic Places in Nevada County, California
Italianate architecture in California
Victorian architecture in California